Michael Mateus Steger (born May 27, 1980) is an American actor. He is best known for his role as Navid Shirazi on The CW's teen drama series 90210.

Early life
In an interview, Steger revealed he was bullied during his childhood in the fourth grade until the sixth grade. He was later transferred to another school when the bullying got too serious.

Career
Steger started his career appearing in several commercials and guest starred in VR Troopers in 1994. After appearing as Mohamed Esfiri on NCIS in 2005, he had a recurring role on The Winner in 2007. He was also cast as the lead role by Tim Burton in The Killers' music video "Bones" in 2006.

As of 2007, Steger has appeared in several Disney Channel productions. He has guest starred on the Hannah Montana episode titled "Everybody Was Best-Friend Fighting", the Cory in the House episode titled "Macho Libre", and had a co-starring role in the Disney Channel Original Movie The Cheetah Girls: One World, which was released on August 22, 2008. He also guest starred on Criminal Minds in 2008.

From 2008 to 2013, Steger played the role of Navid Shirazi on The CW's 90210. He directed and produced a one-woman show called Brandee Built on Crazee starring his wife Brandee Tucker. On 21 April 2016, Steger announced at Twitter that he and Brandee welcomed a baby girl named Poet Louise Steger. On January 10, 2020, Michael and Brandee welcomed a baby boy named Mozart Lee Steger

While his best known role is that of an Iranian-American character, Steger is of mixed Ecuadorean, Norwegian and Austrian descent; he has played characters of many ethnicities, such as Iranian, Indian and Latin American.

Filmography

References

External links
 
 Michael Steger at The CW

1980 births
American male child actors
American male film actors
American male television actors
Living people
Male actors from Los Angeles